Portugal participated in the Eurovision Song Contest 2010 with the song "Há dias assim" written by Augusto Madureira. The song was performed by Filipa Azevedo. The Portuguese broadcaster Rádio e Televisão de Portugal (RTP) organised the national final Festival da Canção 2010 in order to select the Portuguese entry for the 2010 contest in Oslo, Norway. After two semi-finals and a final which took place in March 2010, "Há dias assim" performed by Filipa Azevedo emerged as the winner after achieving the highest score following the combination of votes from twenty regional juries and a public televote.

Portugal was drawn to compete in the first semi-final of the Eurovision Song Contest which took place on 25 May 2010. Performing during the show in position 14, "Há dias assim" was announced among the top 10 entries of the first semi-final and therefore qualified to compete in the final on 29 May. It was later revealed that Portugal placed fourth out of the 17 participating countries in the semi-final with 89 points. In the final, Portugal performed in position 23 and placed eighteenth out of the 25 participating countries with 43 points.

Background 

Prior to the 2010 contest, Portugal had participated in the Eurovision Song Contest forty-three times since its first entry in 1964. The nation's highest placing in the contest was sixth, which they achieved in 1996 with the song "O meu coração não tem cor" performed by Lúcia Moniz. Following the introduction of semi-finals for the 2004, Portugal had featured in only two finals. Portugal's least successful result has been last place, which they have achieved on three occasions, most recently in 1997 with the song "Antes do adeus" performed by Célia Lawson. Portugal has also received nul points on two occasions; in 1964 and 1997. The nation qualified to the final in 2009 and placed fifteenth with the song "Todas as ruas do amor" performed by Flor-de-Lis.

The Portuguese national broadcaster, Rádio e Televisão de Portugal (RTP), broadcasts the event within Portugal and organises the selection process for the nation's entry. RTP confirmed Portugal's participation in the 2010 Eurovision Song Contest on 21 September 2009. The broadcaster has traditionally selected the Portuguese entry for the Eurovision Song Contest via the music competition Festival da Canção, with exceptions in 1988 and 2005 when the Portuguese entries were internally selected. Along with their participation confirmation, the broadcaster revealed details regarding their selection procedure and announced the organization of Festival da Canção 2010 in order to select the 2010 Portuguese entry.

Before Eurovision

Festival da Canção 2010 

Festival da Canção 2010 was the 46th edition of Festival da Canção that selected Portugal's entry for the Eurovision Song Contest 2010. Twenty-four entries competed in the competition that consisted of two semi-finals held on 2 and 4 March 2010 leading to a twelve-song final on 6 March 2010. All three shows of the competition took place at the Campo Pequeno in Lisbon, hosted by Sílvia Alberto and were broadcast on RTP1, RTP1 HD, RTP África and RTP Internacional as well as online via the broadcaster's official website rtp.pt.

Format 
The format of the competition consisted of three shows: two semi-finals on 2 and 4 March 2010 and the final on 6 March 2010. Each semi-final featured twelve competing entries, selected by an online vote in January 2010, from which six advanced from each show to complete the twelve song lineup in the final. Results during the semi-finals were determined exclusively by a public televote, while results during the final were determined by the 50/50 combination of votes from twenty regional juries and public televoting, which was opened following the second semi-final and closed during the final show. Both the public televote and the juries assigned points from 1-8, 10 and 12 based on the ranking developed by both streams of voting.

Competing entries 
Artists and composers were able to submit their entries for the competition between 24 November 2009 and 15 January 2010. Composers of any nationality were allowed to submit entries, however artists were required to possess Portuguese citizenship and songs were required to be submitted in Portuguese. A jury panel consisting of Head of Delegation for Portugal at the Eurovision Song Contest José Poiares, singer-songwriter Tozé Brito, and music producers Fernando Martins and Ramón Galarza selected thirty entries for an online vote from 420 submissions received, which were revealed on 20 January 2010. Among the competing artists was former Eurovision Song Contest entrant Nucha, who represented Portugal in the 1990 contest. On 22 January 2010, "Luta assim não dá", written by Vasco Duarte and Jel and to have been performed by Homens da Luta, was disqualified from the competition due to the song having been performed prior to the competition.

90-second excerpts of the twenty-nine competing entries were released online via rtp.pt on 20 January 2010 and users were able to vote for their favourite songs each day between 21 and 27 January 2010. 42,998 valid votes were received at the conclusion of the voting period and the top twenty-four entries that advanced to the semi-finals were revealed on 28 January 2010.

Shows

Semi-finals
The two semi-finals took place on 2 and 4 March 2010. In each semi-final twelve entries competed and six advanced to the final based solely on a public televote. In addition to the performances of the competing entries, Batoto Yeto, 12 Macacos and Jukebox Project performed as the interval acts in the first semi-final, while St. Dominic's Gospel Choir, Raquel Ferreira, Teresa Radamanto, Portuguese Eurovision 1980 and 1998 entrant José Cid and member of Portuguese Eurovision 2005 entrant 2B Rui Drumond performed as the interval acts in the second semi-final.

Final
The final took place on 6 March 2010. The twelve entries that qualified from the two preceding semi-finals competed and the winner, "Há dias assim" performed by Filipa Azevedo, was selected based on the 50/50 combination of votes of twenty regional juries and a public televote. Voca People, Portuguese Eurovision 1973 entrant Fernando Tordo and Portuguese Eurovision 2009 entrants Flor-de-Lis performed as the interval acts.

Controversy 
The outcome of Festival da Canção 2010 caused much controversy as the public televote winner, Catarina Pereira, only placed second due to the jury only placing her fifth. The announcement of Filipa Azevedo's victory during the competition were met with booing from the audience, with several petitions (one of them which received over 2,000 signatures) being later created in favour of Pereira's Eurovision participation. Criticism was also made towards RTP's selection of the composition of the regional juries, including revelations that the jury members, some of them which were not music professionals, were affiliated with several of the finalists (a former professor of Azevedo was part of the Porto jury that awarded her top marks) in opposition to the competition rules. RTP subsequently released a statement indicating that no competition rules had been violated and that Azevedo would represent Portugal at the 2010 contest.

At Eurovision

According to Eurovision rules, all nations with the exceptions of the host country and the "Big Four" (France, Germany, Spain and the United Kingdom) are required to qualify from one of two semi-finals in order to compete for the final; the top ten countries from each semi-final progress to the final. The European Broadcasting Union (EBU) split up the competing countries into six different pots based on voting patterns from previous contests, with countries with favourable voting histories put into the same pot. On 7 February 2010, a special allocation draw was held which placed each country into one of the two semi-finals, as well as which half of the show they would perform in. Portugal was placed into the first semi-final, to be held on 25 May 2010, and was scheduled to perform in the second half of the show. The running order for the semi-finals was decided through another draw on 23 March 2010 and Portugal was set to perform in position 14, following the entry from Greece and before the entry from Macedonia.

In Portugal, the three shows were broadcast on RTP1, RTP1 HD and RTP Internacional with commentary by Sérgio Mateus. The first semi-final and the final were broadcast live, while the second semi-final was broadcast on delay. The Portuguese spokesperson, who announced the Portuguese votes during the final, was Ana Galvão.

Semi-final 
Filipa Azevedo took part in technical rehearsals on 17 and 21 May, followed by dress rehearsals on 24 and 25 May. This included the jury final where professional juries of each country watched and voted on the competing entries.

The Portuguese performance featured Filipa Azevedo wearing a white dress with a black belt and black bracelet on her arm performing with three backing vocalists were lined up on Azevedo's left side dressed in white and black: Patrícia Antunes, Patricia Silveira and Pedro Mimoso, and a pianist on the singer's right side whose piano had a large lit candle on it: the composer of "Há dias assim" Augusto Madureira. The stage backdrop displayed white, pink and purple colours which transition to sky blue at the end of the performance, with long chains of light bulbs draping from the ceiling to the stage floor.

At the end of the show, Portugal was announced as having finished in the top 10 and subsequently qualifying for the grand final. It was later revealed that Portugal placed fourth in the semi-final, receiving a total of 89 points.

Final 
Shortly after the first semi-final, a winners' press conference was held for the ten qualifying countries. As part of this press conference, the qualifying artists took part in a draw to determine the running order for the final. This draw was done in the order the countries were announced during the semi-final. Portugal was drawn to perform in position 23, following the entry from Germany and before the entry from Israel.

Filipa Azevedo once again took part in dress rehearsals on 28 and 29 May before the final, including the jury final where the professional juries cast their final votes before the live show. Filipa Azevedo performed a repeat of her semi-final performance during the final on 29 May. Portugal placed eighteenth in the final, scoring 43 points.

Voting 
Voting during the three shows involved each country awarding points from 1-8, 10 and 12 as determined by a combination of 50% national jury and 50% televoting. Each nation's jury consisted of five music industry professionals who are citizens of the country they represent. This jury judged each entry based on: vocal capacity; the stage performance; the song's composition and originality; and the overall impression by the act. In addition, no member of a national jury was permitted to be related in any way to any of the competing acts in such a way that they cannot vote impartially and independently.

Following the release of the full split voting by the EBU after the conclusion of the competition, it was revealed that Portugal had placed twentieth with the public televote and thirteenth with the jury vote in the final. In the public vote, Portugal scored 58 points, while with the jury vote, Portugal scored 107 points. In the first semi-final, Portugal placed ninth with the public televote with 58 points and second with the jury vote, scoring 107 points.

Below is a breakdown of points awarded to Portugal and awarded by Portugal in the first semi-final and grand final of the contest. The nation awarded its 12 points to Belgium in the semi-final and to Spain in the final of the contest.

Points awarded to Portugal

Points awarded by Portugal

References

External links
 Festival da Canção voting RTP
  Rules of Festival da Canção 2010 RTP

2010
Countries in the Eurovision Song Contest 2010
Eurovision